This is a list of shopping malls in Bosnia and Herzegovina.

Sarajevo
Mercator Ložionička (2000)
Wisa Shopping Center (2000)
Mercator Centar Dobrinja (2005)
BTC Merkur Otoka (2006)
Grand Centar Ilidža (2007)
ARIA Centar (2009) 
Alta Shopping Center (2010)
Importanne Center (2010)
Sarajevo City Center (2014)
Bingo Plus (2015)
Bingo City Center Sarajevo (2020)

Banja Luka
Boska (1978)
RK Kastel (1982)
Zenit (2001)
Mercator Centar Banja Luka (2008)
Fis (2012)
Emporium (2015)
Retail Park Cajavec (2015)
Hiper Kort (2016)
Delta Planet Banja Luka (2019)
Bingo Plus (2022)

Tuzla
Mercator Centar Tuzla (2004)
Bingo City Center  (2016)

Zenica
Bingo (2007)
Shopping City Džananović (2008)
VF (2010)

Mostar
Shopping Centre Mostar (2001)
Shopping Centre Rondo (2003)
Mercator Centar Mostar (2006)
Piramida (2009)
Bingo (2011)
Mepas Mall (2012)
Fis (2016)
Hercegovinapromet (2017)

Bijeljina
Fis (2004)
Emporium (2005)
Bingo (2012)
Tom (2013)

Prijedor
Wisa (2005)
Bingo (2010)

Brčko
Bingo (2007)
Mercator Centar Brčko (2008)
Fis (2008)

Doboj
Bingo (2011)

Bihać
Bingo (2014)
Fis (2014)

Istočno Sarajevo
Bingo (2015)

Travnik
VF (2003)
Bingo (2008)

Goražde
Bingo (2015)

Vitez
GMS Shopping Center (2000)
Fis (2003)
Franšizni centar Bosne i Hercegovine (2008)

Gračanica
Bingo (2004)
Fis (2005)
Etna Shopping Centar (2008)
Belamionix (2017)

Trebinje
Bingo (2015)

Tešanj
Wisa (2001)
Shopping Centar Jelah (2003)
Mepromex Tešanjka (200?)
Bingo (2014)

Bugojno
Fis (2013)
Bingo (2014)
TC Rose (2014)

Livno
Fis (2009)

Žepče
Libertas (2009)
Fis (2016)

Doboj South
Bingo (2010)
Fis (2016)

Lukavac
Bingo (2005)
VF (2005)
Omega (2008)

Čapljina
Mercator Centar Čapljina (2008)

Maglaj
Wisa (2007)
Bingo (2019)

See also
List of supermarket chains in Bosnia and Herzegovina

Notes 

Tourism in Bosnia and Herzegovina
Economy of Bosnia and Herzegovina
Shopping malls